Kerio Technologies, Inc. is a former technology company specializing in collaboration software and unified threat management for small and medium organizations. Founded in 2001, Kerio is headquartered in San Jose, California. In January 2017, GFI Software acquired Kerio.

History

Kerio Technologies incorporated in 2001, but its first product WinRoute Pro entered the Internet security market in 1997, as it was owned and maintained by Tiny Software  until February 1, 2002. Tiny Software then transferred sales and development of its software to Kerio, where the developers continued to work on it under the Kerio brand.

Kerio's main products (in the early 2000s) were Kerio Personal Firewall and Kerio WinRoute Firewall and the company focused on collaboration software with Kerio MailServer. Kerio discontinued its Personal Firewall in late 2005, which was then acquired by Sunbelt Software.

Starting in 2010, Kerio MailServer was renamed to Kerio Connect and Kerio WinRoute to Kerio Control. Kerio introduced Kerio Operator, an IP PBX system, in 2011 and Samepage, a file sharing and collaboration software, in 2013.

In January 2017, Kerio was bought by GFI Software. Kerio Connect, Kerio Control, Kerio Operator and Kerio Cloud became GFI assets but Samepage was not part of the acquisition.

References

External links

Defunct computer companies based in California
Software companies of the Czech Republic
Companies based in San Jose, California
Firewall software
Privately held companies based in California
VoIP companies of the United States
Defunct software companies of the United States